Ed Oliver may refer to:

Ed Oliver (American football) (born 1997), American football defensive tackle
Ed Oliver (golfer) (1915–1961), American golfer
Ed Oliver (politician), member of the Alabama House of Representatives

See also
Edward Oliver (disambiguation)
Edmund Oliver